{{DISPLAYTITLE:C16H14O2}}
The molecular formula C16H14O2 (molar mass: 238.28 g/mol, exact mass: 238.09938 u) may refer to:

 Benzyl cinnamate
 Methyl hydroxychalcone (MCHP)

Molecular formulas